
Gmina Nowogrodziec is an urban-rural gmina (administrative district) in Bolesławiec County, Lower Silesian Voivodeship, in south-western Poland.

Neighbouring gminas
Gmina Nowogrodziec is bordered by the gminas of Bolesławiec, Gryfów Śląski, Lubań, Lwówek Śląski, Osiecznica, Pieńsk and Węgliniec.

Villages
Apart from the town of Nowogrodziec, the gmina contains the villages of Czerna, Gierałtów, Godzieszów, Gościszów, Kierżno, Milików, Nowa Wieś, Parzyce, Wykroty, Zabłocie, Zagajnik, Zebrzydowa and Zebrzydowa-Wieś.

Twin towns – sister cities

Gmina Nowogrodziec is twinned with:
 Großdubrau, Germany
 Peremyshliany Raion, Ukraine 
 Srbac, Bosnia and Herzegovina

References

Nowogrodziec
Bolesławiec County